Gabrielle Fitzpatrick (born 1 February 1967) is an Australian film and television actress. She first appeared in the Italian film Via Montenapoleone directed by Carlo Vanzina, and has since starred in 11 films, her most recent involvement being in 2017's Fatties: Take Down the House directed by Bob Gordon. Fitzpatrick also has numerous television credits, including multiple notable series such as Lost, 24, and NYPD Blue.

Filmography

Film

Television

References

External links

1967 births
Living people
Actresses from Brisbane
Australian film actresses
Australian television actresses